The 1908 Navy Midshipmen football team represented the United States Naval Academy during the 1908 college football season. In their first season under Frank Berrien, the Midshipmen compiled a  record, shut out seven opponents, and outscored all opponents by a combined score of 218 to 38.

Schedule

References

Navy
Navy Midshipmen football seasons
Navy Midshipmen football